The Western Cemetery is an urban cemetery in Portland, Maine, United States. At one time Portland's home for the "poor and indigent", the cemetery is named for its location in city's West End neighborhood and proximity to the Western Promenade. Founded in the 18th century, the land was acquired by the city in 1829. In 1841, the city expanded the cemetery to its present . The Western Cemetery was Portland's primary cemetery from 1829 to 1852, when Evergreen Cemetery was established in the suburb of Deering. It was an active cemetery until 1910. In October 2003, the cemetery began a restoration and reconstruction project was run by the Stewards of the Western Cemetery and the City of Portland and funded with municipal funds.

Desecrations and disorganization
The Western Cemetery is known for a large number of grave desecrations and general disorganization; for example, from July 1, 1988 to August 1, 1989, an estimated 1,942 tombs were desecrated. Likewise, it is unknown how many burials have taken place in the cemetery, though author William Jordan estimated 6,600. A plan was laid out in 1840, but the document was destroyed in the 1866 Great Fire alongside much of the city. A number of tombs have been opened with no contents found inside; for example the Longfellow tomb, home to the parents of Portland resident Henry Wadsworth Longfellow, was opened and nothing was found inside, with no record of what happened to those entombed there.

Old Catholic Ground
The Old Catholic Ground is an area in the cemetery used for Catholics, mainly (Irish) immigrants who arrived in the community in the early to mid 19th century, and for those who fled the Great Hunger from 1845 to 1852. People were buried in the Catholic section of the cemetery because there was no stand alone Catholic burial place in the community prior to 1858. The Catholic section is also known for headstones containing references to the names of counties in Ireland, and is built on what used to be known as Brown's Hill. From 1858 through the 1870s, several dozen Catholic burials were removed from Western Cemetery and reinterred at the new Catholic Cemetery named Calvary Cemetery in South Portland, Maine when it opened in 1858. Calvary Cemetery is operated by the Diocese. In 1999, the Ancient Order of Hibernians, Division I, erected a stone marking the area as the Catholic Ground, and commemorating those who perished during, or fled from The Great Hunger (An Gorta Mór).

Notable burials

 John Neal,  eccentric and influential 19th-century writer, critic, and lecturer
 Elijah Kellogg, Congregationalist minister, lecturer and author of popular boy's adventure books.
 Samuel Longfellow, clergyman and hymn writer.
 Stephen Longfellow, Congressman from Massachusetts, father of Henry Wadsworth Longfellow
 Prentiss Mellen, First Chief Justice of the Maine Supreme Court

References

Further reading

 Burial records, 1811–1980, of the Western Cemetery in Portland, Maine 
 The Western Cemetery Project, Ancient Order of Hibernians, South Portland, Maine

Cemeteries in Portland, Maine
1829 establishments in Maine
Irish-American culture in Maine
West End (Portland, Maine)